is a Japanese football player who plays for Tokyo Verdy.

Playing career
Morita was born in Tokyo on August 8, 2000. He joined J2 League club Tokyo Verdy from youth team in 2018. On August 22, 2018, he debuted against Urawa Reds in Emperor's Cup.

For the 2023 season, he was appointed as club's new captain.

Club statistics
Updated to 19 July 2022.

References

External links

2000 births
Living people
Association football people from Tokyo
Japanese footballers
J2 League players
Tokyo Verdy players
Association football midfielders